Franklin Henry Giddings (March 23, 1855 – June 11, 1931) was an American sociologist and economist.

Biography
Giddings was born at Sherman, Connecticut. He graduated from Union College (1877). For ten years he wrote items for the Springfield, Massachusetts Republican and the Daily Union. In 1888 he was appointed lecturer in political science at Bryn Mawr College; in 1894 he became professor of sociology at Columbia University. From 1892 to 1905 he was a vice president of the American Academy of Political and Social Science.

His most significant contribution is the concept of the consciousness of kind, which is a state of mind whereby one conscious being recognizes another as being of like mind. All human motives organize themselves around consciousness of kind as a determining principle. Association leads to conflict which leads to consciousness of kind through communication, imitation, toleration, co-operation, and alliance. Eventually the group achieves a self-consciousness of its own (as opposed to individual self-consciousness) from which traditions and social values can arise.

In 1914 he became one of the inaugural Fellows of the American Statistical Association.

Works
 The Modern Distributive Process (in collaboration with J.B. Clark, 1888).
 The Theory of Sociology (1894).
 The Principles of Sociology (1896).
 The Theory of Socialization (1897).
 Elements of Sociology (1898).
 Democracy and Empire (1900).
 Inductive Sociology (1901).
 Descriptive and Historical Sociology (1906).

See also
 Collective behavior

References

External links

 
 
 Works by Franklyn Henry Giddings, at Hathi Trust
 Interview on the economic aspects of the War by Edward Marshall, New York Times. Published January 9, 1915
 
Franklin Henry Giddings Collection. General Collection, Beinecke Rare Book and Manuscript Library, Yale University.

People from Sherman, Connecticut
American political writers
American male non-fiction writers
American sociologists
Fellows of the American Statistical Association
Presidents of the American Sociological Association
Economists from New York (state)
1855 births
1931 deaths
Union College (New York) alumni
Mathematicians from New York (state)
Economists from Connecticut